Carnival Ride is the second studio album by American country music artist Carrie Underwood. It was released in the United States on October 23, 2007, by Arista Nashville. On this album, Underwood was more involved in the songwriting process; she set up a writers' retreat at Nashville's famed Ryman Auditorium to collaborate with Music Row tunesmiths such as Hillary Lindsey, Craig Wiseman, Rivers Rutherford, and Gordie Sampson.

Carnival Ride debuted at number one on the US Billboard 200 chart, selling over 527,000 copies and achieving one of the biggest ever first-week sales by a female artist. It was the singer's first album to debut at number one on the Billboard 200 and second to debut atop the Top Country Albums chart. The album was certified quadruple platinum, it has sold 3.4 million copies in the United States, and four million copies worldwide.

Five singles were released from the album — "So Small", "All-American Girl", "Last Name", "Just a Dream", and "I Told You So". The first four singles reached number one on the US Billboard Hot Country Songs chart, thus making Underwood the first solo female artist to pull four number ones from one album since Shania Twain did so with her album The Woman in Me in 1995–1996. All singles were Top 30 hits on the Billboard Hot 100 chart, with "I Told You So" climbing to number nine and both "So Small" and "Last Name" reaching the Top 20.

The album and its songs were largely praised by music critics. Underwood won two Grammy Awards - one for Best Female Country Vocal Performance for "Last Name", at the 2009 Grammy Awards, and one for Best Country Collaboration with Vocals for "I Told You So", at the 2010 Grammy Awards. Carnival Ride was nominated for Album of the Year at the Academy of Country Music Awards and Country Music Association Awards and won the American Music Award for Favorite Country Album, in 2008.

Background
Underwood explained the meaning behind the album's title and theme, saying:

Two of this album's tracks have been previously recorded by other artists. "Flat on the Floor" was previously cut by singer Katrina Elam on her unreleased 2007 album Turn Me Up, and was a number 52 hit on the country charts for her that year. "I Told You So" is a cover of a song previously cut by Randy Travis on his 1988 number one album Always & Forever. Travis' version of the song was a Number One hit on the country charts that year. Underwood and Travis  released "I Told You So" as a duet single on iTunes, and they also performed it on the results show of the eighth season of American Idol during the Grand Ole Opry week. The duet later went on to win the Grammy Award for Best Country Collaboration with Vocals. About the track, "I Know You Won't", Underwood said, "You get different feelings from different songs, and that one always just felt soft and vulnerable. It’s a song about being disappointed. And, yeah, it’s not so vibrato-heavy – but I guess it’s good that I can do something that sounds different, maybe something surprising.” She described the recording process of the album, saying "We’ll go in with everything in a key that I think is fine, and then he’ll [Mark Bright] want to raise it a half-step, whole-step, step and a half, whatever. ‘So Small’ and ‘All-American Girl’ are surprisingly difficult to sing. ‘All-American Girl’ doesn't ever come down, really.” She also admitted to having more creative control for this album, saying, "I was in the studio whether we were recording or not. If Mark [Bright] was doing something I’d come by and listen to the background vocals that were being put down, and if I found something I didn’t like maybe I’d tell the background vocalists that I think it would sound better if we did it like this,” she says. “Mark was super open because it’s my voice and my album, and in the end I’m the one who should be most pleased with it.”

Marketing and promotion
Underwood promoted the record through both a joint tour with Keith Urban, Love, Pain, and the Whole Crazy Carnival Ride Tour,  which ran from January to April 2008, while simultaneously embarking on her first solo headliner, the Carnival Ride Tour, which ran from February to December 2008.

She debuted several of her singles at the Academy of Country Music Awards and the Country Music Association Awards.

She also appeared on several shows to promote her album including The Ellen DeGeneres Show, The Oprah Winfrey Show, Saturday Night Live, Live With Regis and Kelly, The Early Show, American Idol, Good Morning America, Dick Clark's New Year's Rockin' Eve, The View, and at the Grand Ole Opry.

A Limited Edition CD/DVD release was made available only at Target stores. The DVD includes four live acoustic performances, as well as a four-part interview.

Following this a Platinum MusicPass edition was released on January 15, 2008. This release included a previously unreleased track, "Sometimes You Leave", and two music videos.

On October 21, 2008, a 2-disc set was released at Wal-Mart. The second CD contains five Christmas tracks, of which all were available for radio download on September 29, 2008. One of the tracks, "Do You Hear What I Hear", was previously released on the 2007 album Hear Something Country Christmas.

Singles
"So Small" served as the lead single for the album. It was released in mid-August 2007, two months before the album's official release and debuted on the U.S. Billboard Hot Country Songs at number 20, making it the highest chart debut by a solo country female artist in 43 years of Nielsen BDS history. It eventually held the number one spot for 3 consecutive weeks. It also became her fifth top 20 hit when it peaked at number 17 on U.S. Billboard Hot 100. "So Small" has become a cross-over hit, selling over 1,088,000 downloads, and being certified platinum.

The second single, "All-American Girl", was released around December 2007. It also became a success by hitting number one on the U.S. Billboard Hot Country Songs where it stayed there for 2 weeks and on the Canadian Country Charts where it stayed there for 5 weeks. It also managed to be a top 30 single on the U.S. Billboard Hot 100, where it peaked at number 27, making it her sixth top 30. As of 2015, "All-American Girl" sold 1,800,000 copies in the United States. The song was certified 2× platinum.

The third single, "Last Name", became Underwood's fastest single to hit number one on the U.S. Billboard Hot Country Songs after only 13 weeks of its official release around April 2008. It stayed there for one week. It is also Underwood's sixth top 20 hit, reaching number 19 on the U.S. Billboard Hot 100. The song also won Underwood her third consecutive win for Grammy Award for Best Female Country Vocal Performance category. As of November 2015, the song has sold 1,300,000 copies.

The fourth single, "Just a Dream", reached Number One on the country charts for the chart week of November 8, 2008 and stayed there for 2 weeks, thus making Underwood the first solo female artist to pull four number one's from one album since Shania Twain did it with The Woman in Me. It became her seventh number one single on the U.S. Billboard Hot Country Songs chart and eighth number one country single overall. It also managed to reach number 29 on U.S. Billboard Hot 100, becoming her 10th top 30 there. The song also gave Underwood her fourth consecutive nomination for the Grammy Award for Best Female Country Vocal Performance. The song was certified platinum on the week ending on September 4, 2011, giving Underwood her seventh platinum hit. As of November 2015, it sold 1,280,000 copies.

The fifth single, "I Told You So" was officially released on February 2, 2009. It became Underwood's fourth top 10 all-genre hit, peaking at number nine on the U.S Billboard Hot 100. On the week of April 10, it climbed to the top of the Canadian Country Charts and stayed there for one week. The song peaked at number two on the Hot Country Songs chart, making it only her second country single to not reach number one on that chart after "Don't Forget To Remember Me" which also peaked at number two. Underwood rerecorded the song with original artist Randy Travis, and the song won her and Travis the Grammy Award for Best Country Collaboration with Vocals. As of January 2013, the song has been certified platinum. It has sold 1,089,000 copies as of November 2015.

Critical reception

Carnival Ride received mostly positive reviews from music critics. On the music review aggregator Metacritic, it has received an average score of 72 out of 100 based on ten reviews indicating generally favorable reviews.

The first official review of the album from AllMusic gave it 4 out of 5 stars, on par with what they gave her debut. The site classified the album as "completely contemporary country", and said "the remarkable thing about Carnival Ride is that it's stronger song for song than Some Hearts." They also praised the album for having "the appearance of a genuine heart, something that no other big country-pop album has had since the glory days of Come On Over." USA Today also praised the album for its versatility saying "The songs call for vulnerability ("You Won’t Find This"), urgency ("Flat on the Floor"), sympathy ("Crazy Dreams", her co-written salute to “the hairbrush singers and dashboard drummers” from whose ranks she sprang), humor ("The More Boys I Meet," the tag line of which goes “The more I love my dog”) and extreme role-playing ('Last Name's saga of a bar pickup that turns into an impulsive Vegas marriage). She delivers on all counts." Rolling Stone praised Underwood's country stylings, writing, "Carnival Ride is more country and therefore more confident. She goes for the girl-next-door cred long since given up by Faith Hill in uptempo gems like “The More Boys I Meet” (“The more I love my dog”)." The Boston Herald gave the album a B, and claimed, "Underwood manages enough spunk to occasionally avoid the cookie-cutter, especially with the curious beat-box-meets-banjo arrangement of "Get Out of This Town" and "Just a Dream," a bona fide [tearjerker] about a young war widow." Slant gave a negative review, criticizing both the songwriting and Underwood's interpretation, writing, "Like Dion and McBride, Underwood has a rabid fanbase of people who sit in slack-jawed awe of her steely technical precision. Carnival Ride simply doesn’t offer anything for the unconverted in terms of Underwood’s growth either as a vocalist or as an artist."

Accolades

Commercial performance
Carnival Ride became Underwood's first number-one album on the U.S. Billboard 200, selling 527,000 copies in its first week of release. It achieved one of the biggest ever first-week sales by a female artist at that time. In its second week the album sold less than 190,000 copies. The album also debuted at number 1 on the Top Digital Albums, Top Country Albums, and Top Canadian Albums charts. The album has sold 3,400,000 copies in the United States. In October 2016, the album was certified 4× platinum by the Recording Industry Association of America (RIAA) for combined sales and album-equivalent units of four million units.

It appeared on the Billboard Year-End Charts for 2009 at number 74.

Track listing

Personnel 

Musicians
 Carrie Underwood – lead vocals, backing vocals
 Charles Judge – Hammond organ, synthesizer, strings, programming, lap steel guitar, drum loops
 Jimmy Nichols – piano, synthesizer
 Tom Bukovac – electric guitar
 Gordie Sampson – acoustic guitar, mandolin, piano
 Ilya Toshinsky – acoustic guitar, banjo
 Aubrey Haynie – mandolin, fiddle
 Jonathan Yudkin – mandolin, fiddle, cello (4), viola (4), violin (4), arco bass (4), string arrangements and composer (4)
 Paul Franklin – dobro, steel guitar
 Mike Johnson – steel guitar
 Jimmie Lee Sloas – bass guitar
 Matt Chamberlain – drums
 Chris McHugh – drums
 Eric Darken – percussion
 Chris McDonald – string arrangements and composer (7, 13)
 Carl Gorodetzky – string contractor (7, 13)
 Lisa Cochran – backing vocals
 Wes Hightower – backing vocals
 Hillary Lindsey – backing vocals

The Nashville String Machine (tracks 7 & 13):
 Cello – John Catchings, Anthony LaMarchina, Keith Nicholas, Carole Rabonowitz, Sari Reist and June Tanner 
 Double bass – Jack Jezzro and Craig Nelson
 Viola – Monisa Angell, Bruce Christensen, Chris Farrell, Jim Grosjean, Gary Van Osdale and Kris Wilkinson 
 Violin – David Angell, Carrie Bailey, Denise Baker, Zeneba Bowers, Beverly Drukker, Conni Ellisor, Carl Gorodetzky, Gerald Greer, Erin Hall, Cate Myer, Pamela Sixfin, Betty Small, Alan Umstead, Catherine Umstead and Karen Winkelmann

Production
 Mark Bright – producer
 Renée Bell – A&R
 Derek Bason – recording engineer, mixing
 Chris Ashburn – assistant recording, mix assistant 
 Nathan Dickinson – assistant recording, mix assistant, digital editing
 Aaron Kasdorf – additional recording, assistant recording
 Todd Tidwell – additional recording, assistant recording
 J.R. Rodriguez – additional recording, digital editing
 Hank Williams – mastering at Master Mix (Nashville, Tennessee)
 Kirsten Wines – production assistant
 Mike "Frog" Griffith – production coordination
 Judy Forde Blair – creative director, liner notes
 S. Wade Hunt – art direction
 Astrid Herbold May – design
 Andrew Eccles – photography
 Mellissa Schleicher – make-up, hair stylist
 Trish Townsend – stylist
 Ann Edelblute – management
 Simon Fuller – management

Charts

Weekly charts

Year-end charts

Singles

Decade-end charts

Notes
A ^ "Just a Dream" charted under unsolicited airplay on the Pop 100 for one week in 2007 where it peaked at number 96.

Certifications

Release history

References 

2007 albums
Carrie Underwood albums
Arista Records albums
Albums produced by Mark Bright (record producer)
19 Recordings albums
Arista Nashville albums